Aeroflot Flight 513 was a domestic scheduled passenger flight operated by Aeroflot that crashed during takeoff from Kuybyshev Airport in the Soviet Union on 8 March 1965, resulting in the deaths of 30 passengers and crew. It was the first fatal accident involving a Tupolev Tu-124.

Aircraft 
The aircraft involved in the accident was a Tupolev Tu-124V with two Soloviev D-20P engines, registered SSSR-45028 to the Soviet Union's state airline, Aeroflot. At the time of the accident, the aircraft had accumulated 1,612 flight hours and 1,151 pressurization cycles in service.

Crew 
Thirty passengers and nine crew members were on board the flight. The crew consisted of the following:
 Captain Ivan Kostin
 Captain trainee Victor Sjulin
 Check captain Pavel Saveliev
 Co-pilot Victor Kiryakov
 Radio operator Evgeny Ivanov
 Flight engineer Alexander Danilov
 Navigator Leonid Gostev
 
Stewardesses Zoya Chicherina and Tamara Kolesnikova worked in the cabin.

Flight and accident
The aircraft was de-iced before takeoff. In the cockpit, the check captain observing the trainee's performance sat on the right; the trainee sat on the left. The captains and first officer remained in the cabin and did not assist the trainee and check captain during takeoff. Flight 513 took off from the runway at a bearing of 100°. At an altitude of 40–50 meters the angle of attack increased to the point of causing a stall. The Tu-124 never recovered from the stall and crashed into a field of snow. Originally the crew and sixteen passengers died in the crash, but five passengers later died in hospital from their injuries.

Cause 
The investigation concluded that the accident was most likely caused by:  
 Failure of the altitude indicators to display the correct outputs as result of a design flaw in the Tu-124;  
 Water ingress from de-icing causing the altitude indicator to malfunction.  
One member of the investigation board disagreed with the conclusions reached, insisting that the accident was caused by pilot error.

References 

Aviation accidents and incidents in 1965
Aviation accidents and incidents in the Soviet Union
513
1965 in the Soviet Union
Accidents and incidents involving the Tupolev Tu-124
Airliner accidents and incidents caused by mechanical failure